Muhudugama Hewage Gunaratna Weerakoon (10 November 1947 – 24 December 2021) was a Sri Lankan teacher and politician. He was a member of the Parliament of Sri Lanka and a government minister. He died on 24 December 2021, at the age of 74.

References

Sources
 

1947 births
2021 deaths
Members of the 13th Parliament of Sri Lanka
Members of the 14th Parliament of Sri Lanka
Sri Lanka Freedom Party politicians
United People's Freedom Alliance politicians
Government ministers of Sri Lanka
Provincial councillors of Sri Lanka
Alumni of the University of Sri Jayewardenepura
People from Galle District